Second Amendment Sisters, Inc. (SAS) was a United States women's gun rights advocacy group that supported gun use for self defense and empowerment. According to a 2003 Los Angeles Times article, SAS was founded in December 1999 by five women who were "outraged" by the Million Mom March. The national organization closed in 2015, though individual state chapters continue to operate independently.

See also
Gun politics in the US
Second Amendment to the United States Constitution

References

External links
Second Amendment Sisters Records at the Mount Holyoke College Archives and Special Collections 

501(c)(4) nonprofit organizations
Gun rights advocacy groups in the United States
Organizations established in 1999
Organizations disestablished in 2015
Women's political advocacy groups in the United States
1999 establishments in the United States
2015 disestablishments in the United States